Chael Sonnen's Wrestling Underground is an amateur wrestling promotion company based on Oregon, United States and ran by Chael Sonnen. The promotion made its debut on August 30, 2020 via UFC Fight Pass.

Ruleset 
Despite the events being held inside an octagon, the rules remain similar to the traditional freestyle and Greco-Roman (which are provided by United World Wrestling), as per stated by the promotion's founder Chael Sonnen and seen in the first card held.

Event list

Wrestling Underground I 

Chael Sonnen's Wrestling Underground I was an amateur wrestling event that took place on August 30, 2020 at an undisclosed location in the Pacific Northwest. Also the first card in the history of the company, it was aired on UFC Fight Pass.

Card

References 

Amateur wrestling
Wrestling in Oregon
Freestyle wrestling
Recurring sporting events established in 2020
Greco-Roman wrestling